The Norwegian railway network has used two types of train radio, Scanet and GSM-R. A train radio is a mobile telecommunications network that allows a train driver, maintenance crews and other rail transport officials to communicate with a dispatcher or each other. Scanet was an analog radio system installed on the main lines, limited to electrified lines with automatic train protection, between 1995 and 1999. The implementation left out many lines, which were instead covered by Nordic Mobile Telephone (NMT 450) network.

The lack of a train radio on the Røros Line was a contributing factor to the Åsta accident. This spurred the demand for full coverage. At the same time, the European Union required new systems to use the GSM-R standard, which will be implemented throughout Europe. GSM-R was rolled out between 2004 and 2007 and covers almost the entire network. It was also built to have 100% coverage in all tunnels, which was not achieved with Scanet. GSM-R was first rolled out on lines without Scanet, and then replaced the older system right-out. Both Scanet and GSM-R consist of mobile station in the trains, base stations along the track, and a core network connected to the central traffic control centers. The implementation of GSM-R cost 1.8 billion Norwegian krone.

List
The following is a list of all railway lines with train radio. It includes the date of opening of the train radio, including the affected section, and the standard used. Freight-only lines are excluded from the list, even if they may have had Scanet or have GSM-R.

References

History of rail transport in Norway
Railway signaling in Norway
Train radio in Norway